Kot Tarhala is a village in the district Muzaffarabad, Azad Kashmir.
. It is situated at 65 km from Muzaffarabad, 142 km from Rawalpindi. Majority of the people are educated.
Surroundings:The village linked with other famous towns by roads i.e. in the Northeast Dhirkot and in the Southwest Dana Kachilli is situated.
 Educational System:There are two Govt. high schools and three middle schools in the area. The majority of population is educated.
 People:'''
As this area is located at a huge distance from the big cities so the people usually used to farming that is why they are hardworking. There is no much poverty like other rural areas.

References

Imis Govt Pakistan

Azad Kashmir